Bourscheid is a commune and small town in north-eastern Luxembourg. It is part of the canton of Diekirch, which is part of the district of Diekirch.

, the town of Bourscheid, which lies in the centre of the commune, had a population of 266, which subsequently increased to 466 by 2021.  Other settlements within the commune include Goebelsmuhle, Lipperscheid, Michelau, Schlindermanderscheid, and Welscheid.

Bourscheid Castle located close to the village is Luxembourg's largest and one of the most important medieval castles between the Meuse and the Rhine.

Population

References

External links
 

 
Communes in Diekirch (canton)
Towns in Luxembourg